Eutelsat 36B (formerly Eutelsat W7) is a communications satellite in the W series operated by Eutelsat. It is co-located with Eutelsat 36A satellite at 36° East. It was launched on 24 November 2009, at 14:19:10 UTC, by a Proton launch vehicle.

Satellite description 
Eutelsat and Alcatel Alenia Space announced in December 2006 that the two companies have signed a contract under which Alcatel Alenia Space will manufacture and deliver the Eutelsat W7 communications satellite.

Eutelsat 36B is one of the most powerful spacecraft in the fleet of Eutelsat. Digital broadcasting and direct-to-home (DTH) video services is beamed to customers in Russia and Sub-Saharan Africa. The new satellite replaced all the capacity on the SESAT 1 (now Eutelsat 16C) satellite, which was redeployed to 16° East after nearly 10 years of operations at 36° East. Eutelsat 36B communications payload is connected to five downlink beams for Europe, Russia, Africa, the Middle East, and Central Asia.

Eutelsat 36B is expected to be replaced by Eutelsat 36D, currently scheduled for launch in late 2024.

References

External links 
 EUTELSAT 36B
 EUTELSAT 36B Coverage maps at Satbeams
 IMS Official provider's site

Communications satellites in geostationary orbit
Spacecraft launched in 2009
Satellites using the Spacebus bus
Eutelsat satellites